Faver is a frazione of the comune of Altavalle in Trentino in the northern Italian region Trentino-Alto Adige/Südtirol, located about  northeast of Trento.    
 

 
Former municipalities of Trentino